Hamza Hafidi (born 9 February 1993) is a Moroccan professional footballer who plays as a midfielder.

Club career
Hafidi signed his first professional contract with Ligue 2 side Angers SCO in June 2013. He had made his debut for the team a few months before, in a 2–1 home defeat against Clermont Foot in January 2013.

On 11 August 2016, Hafidi joined Le Mans.

Honours

International
Morocco
Islamic Solidarity Games: 2013

References

External links

Hamza Hafidi foot-national.com Profile

1993 births
Living people
Association football midfielders
Moroccan footballers
Ligue 2 players
Championnat National players
Championnat National 2 players
USJA Carquefou players
Angers SCO players
Le Mans FC players
Expatriate footballers in France
Moroccan expatriate footballers
Moroccan expatriate sportspeople in France